Canton of Cholet-2 is a canton of France, located in the Maine-et-Loire department, in the Pays de la Loire region. At the French canton reorganisation which came into effect in March 2015, the canton was expanded from 10 to 26 communes (7 of which merged into the new commune Lys-Haut-Layon):

Cernusson  
Les Cerqueux
Chanteloup-les-Bois
Cholet (partly)
Cléré-sur-Layon
Coron
Lys-Haut-Layon
Maulévrier
Mazières-en-Mauges
Montilliers
Nuaillé
Passavant-sur-Layon
La Plaine
Saint-Paul-du-Bois
Somloire
La Tessoualle
Toutlemonde
Trémentines
Vezins
Yzernay

See also
 Arrondissement of Cholet
 Cantons of the Maine-et-Loire department
 Communes of the Maine-et-Loire department

References

External links
  Canton of Cholet 2 on the website of the General Council of Maine-et-Loire

Cholet 2
Cholet